Ab Kulak (also Romanized as Āb Kūlak) is a village in Kushk Rural District, Abezhdan District, Andika County, Khuzestan Province, Iran. At the 2006 census, its population was 41, in 8 families.

References 

Populated places in Andika County